This is a list of all the tire companies.

Notes

References